In the United States, the Child Nutrition Programs are a grouping of programs funded by the federal government to support meal and milk service programs for children in schools, residential and day care facilities, family and group day care homes, and summer day camps, and for low-income pregnant and postpartum women, infants, and children under age 5 in local WIC clinics.

Programs include school lunch, school breakfast, summer food service, special milk, commodity distribution, after-school care and Department of Defense overseas dependents school programs, and the special supplemental nutrition program for women, infants and children (WIC).  These programs are authorized under the Richard B. Russell National School Lunch Act (P.L. 79-396, as amended) and the Child Nutrition Act of 1966; (P.L. 89-642, as amended, 42 U.S.C. 1771 et seq.) are financed by annual agricultural appropriations laws; and are administered by the Food and Nutrition Service (FNS) of the USDA.

Changes to the authorizing statutes generally are made by the Agriculture, Nutrition and Forestry Committee in the Senate.  In the House, the Education and the Workforce Committee deals with most changes to child nutrition program authorizing statutes, although the Agriculture Committee usually is involved when proposed changes concern agricultural interests such as commodity distribution, food restrictions, and the Farmers Market Nutrition Program.

References 

United States Department of Agriculture